John Charles Barley (30 October 1904–1962) was an English footballer who played in the Football League for Arsenal and Reading.

References

1904 births
1962 deaths
English footballers
Association football midfielders
English Football League players
Arsenal F.C. players
Reading F.C. players
Maidenhead United F.C. players